The following is a list of ecoregions in Angola, according to the Worldwide Fund for Nature (WWF).

Terrestrial ecoregions
by major habitat type

Tropical and subtropical moist broadleaf forests

 Atlantic Equatorial coastal forests

Tropical and subtropical dry broadleaf forests

 Zambezian Cryptosepalum dry forests

Tropical and subtropical grasslands, savannas, and shrublands

 Angolan miombo woodlands
 Angolan mopane woodlands
 Central Zambezian miombo woodlands
 Southern Congolian forest–savanna mosaic
 Western Congolian forest–savanna mosaic
 Western Zambezian grasslands

Flooded grasslands and savannas

 Zambezian flooded grasslands

Montane grasslands and shrublands

 Angolan montane forest–grassland mosaic
 Angolan scarp savanna and woodlands

Deserts and xeric shrublands

 Kaokoveld desert
 Namibian savanna woodlands

Mangroves

 Central African mangroves

Freshwater ecoregions
by bioregion

West Coastal Equatorial

 Southern West Coastal Equatorial

Congo

 Kasai
 Lower Congo

Cuanza

 Cuanza

Zambezi

 Etosha
 Namib Coastal
 Zambezi
 Upper Zambezi Floodplains
 Zambezian Headwaters
 Okavango Floodplains

Marine ecoregions
 Angolan
 Namib

References
 
 Spalding, Mark D., Helen E. Fox, Gerald R. Allen, Nick Davidson et al. "Marine Ecoregions of the World: A Bioregionalization of Coastal and Shelf Areas". Bioscience Vol. 57 No. 7, July/August 2007, pp. 573–583.
 Thieme, Michelle L. (2005). Freshwater Ecoregions of Africa and Madagascar: A Conservation Assessment. Island Press, Washington DC.

Ecoregions of Africa

Angola
Ecoregions